Rick Folstad (born October 18, 1951) is a retired light welterweight professional boxer from Minneapolis, Minnesota.

Professional career
Folstad made his professional debut on January 29, 1975 with a decision win against Robert Bo Moody.  He won his first seventeen professional fights, highlighted by back-to-back wins against Bobby Rodriguez and a 10-round points win against Al Ford, whose record was 49-6 at the time. Folstad's first loss was a surprising points loss to Johnny Copeland, who was winless in his last six fights.  After the loss to Copeland Folstad only fought four more times, going 3-1, and then retired with a final record of 20-2 with 7 wins by knockout.

Notes

1951 births
Living people
Boxers from Minnesota
Light-welterweight boxers
American male boxers